Callum Jack Robinson (born 2 February 1995) is a professional footballer who plays as a forward for EFL Championship side Cardiff City and the  Republic of Ireland national team.

Robinson is a product of the Aston Villa academy. He twice played for Preston on loan from Aston Villa before joining on a permanent deal in 2016. Robinson played internationally for England at all youth levels up to the under-20 side but declared for the Republic of Ireland in March 2018, for whom he is qualified by maternal descent.

Club career

Aston Villa
Robinson is a product of the Aston Villa youth team. He made his Villa debut on 24 September 2013 in the League Cup third round in a 0–4 home defeat by Tottenham Hotspur, replacing Aleksandar Tonev for the final eight minutes. His Premier League debut came on 19 April 2014, replacing Andreas Weimann for the last five minutes of a goalless draw with Southampton at Villa Park, and he made three further substitute appearances that season.

Loan to Preston North End
Robinson was loaned to Preston North End of League One on a one-month deal on 16 September 2014 and made his debut that night as a substitute against a Chesterfield side featuring fellow Villa loanee Daniel Johnson. His first professional goal came on 28 October. He opened a 2–0 win at Leyton Orient by converting Chris Humphrey's cross. On 10 November Robinson scored a hat-trick against Havant & Waterlooville in a 3–0 away win in the first round of the FA Cup. Following a successful spell with Preston, during which he scored five goals in 11 league and cup appearances, Robinson was recalled by Aston Villa on 25 November, despite his loan having been extended until January 2015.

Robinson returned to Preston on loan for the rest of the 2014–15 season on transfer deadline day, 2 February 2015.

Loan to Bristol City
On 7 August 2015, Robinson joined Bristol City on loan for the 2015–16 season. He scored his first goal for the club in a 3–1 defeat to Luton Town in the League Cup four days later. His loan with City was cut short on 2 January 2016 after falling out of the first team, having made no appearances since October.

Return to Preston North End
On 5 January 2016, Robinson re-signed for Preston until the end of the season, taking the number 37 shirt.

On 4 July 2016, Robinson joined Preston North End on a three-year deal after two successful loan spells.

Sheffield United
Robinson signed a four-year contract for Sheffield United on 12 July 2019 for an undisclosed fee.

West Bromwich Albion
On 29 January 2020, Robinson joined West Bromwich Albion on loan until the end of the 2019–20 season.

On 9 September 2020, Robinson joined West Brom on a five-year deal as part of a swap deal sending Oliver Burke to Sheffield United. On 3 April 2021, he scored a brace of goals in a 5–2 victory over Chelsea at Stamford Bridge. The first of these would go on to be awarded West Brom's Goal of the Season, along with being nominated for the Premier League Goal of the Month for April.

Cardiff City
On 1 September 2022, Robinson joined Cardiff City on a 3 year deal from West Bromwich Albion for £1.75mil.

International career
Robinson was born in England, to a father of Jamaican descent and mother of Irish descent. He played for England at under-16 and under-17 levels. He made his England under-19 debut as a substitute against Hungary on 14 November 2013. He scored his first U19 goal in the 88th minute of the same match. He was also eligible to represent Ireland and declared for them in March 2018. He qualifies through his Monaghan-born grandmother.

He made his Republic of Ireland debut on 6 September 2018 in a 4–1 defeat to Wales in the UEFA Nations League.

He scored his first goal for Ireland on 14 November 2019 in a 3–1 win against New Zealand.

On 9 October 2021, Robinson scored twice as Ireland won 3–0 away to Azerbaijan in a 2022 FIFA World Cup qualifier to secure Stephen Kenny his first competitive win as Ireland manager. He subsequently scored a hat-trick three days later in a friendly against Qatar. He became the first player to score a hat-trick for Ireland since Robbie Keane in 2014, and the first to score in two consecutive matches since Jon Walters in June 2017.

Career statistics

Club

International

Scores and results list the Republic of Ireland's goal tally first, score column indicates score after each Robinson goal.

See also
 List of Republic of Ireland international footballers born outside the Republic of Ireland

References

External links

1995 births
Living people
Footballers from Northampton
Republic of Ireland association footballers
Republic of Ireland international footballers
English footballers
England youth international footballers
Irish people of Jamaican descent
Sportspeople of Jamaican descent
English people of Irish descent
English sportspeople of Jamaican descent
Aston Villa F.C. players
Preston North End F.C. players
Bristol City F.C. players
Sheffield United F.C. players
Association football forwards
Black Irish sportspeople
Premier League players
English Football League players
West Bromwich Albion F.C. players